Kristoffer Wikner Sundborg (born January 20, 1993) is a Swedish retired ice hockey player, a winger. He made his Elitserien debut playing with Frölunda HC during the 2011–12 season and played a total of 21 Elitserien games during the 2011–12 and 2012–13 seasons with Frölunda. The majority of his professional career was played with teams in the HockeyAllsvenskan and Hockeyettan. After struggling with recovery from a concussion for several years, Wikner retired in 2018.

References

External links

1993 births
Living people
Frölunda HC players
Kristianstads IK players
IK Pantern players
People from Kungsbacka
Swedish ice hockey left wingers
Swedish ice hockey right wingers